Ernest "Doc" Paulin (June 22, 1907 – November 20, 2007) was a New Orleans jazz brass band leader and trumpeter.

Biography
Paulin was born in Wallace, Louisiana, in St. John the Baptist Parish to a Creole French speaking family. Paulin's father played the accordion. Edgar Peters, his uncle, was a trombonist. Paulin relocated to nearby New Orleans in his youth. He was active on the city's music scene since the 1920s and continued performing marching in long parades into the 1990s. His non-Union band gave many young musicians their start in playing professionally.

Paulin had 13 children, six of whom played music professionally, starting in their father's band. His sons continue to have one of the city's better known brass bands, the Paulin Brothers Band. Son Rickey Paulin, a clarinet player, was displaced to Houston by Hurricane Katrina in 2005.

Paulin's band was featured in Always for Pleasure, an award-winning documentary about New Orleans culture. Paulin recorded in the early 1960s with Emile Barnes on Icon Records, and in 1980 his brass band made an LP released on Folkways. He also performs on the CD by his sons' 1996 Paulin Brothers Jazz Band The Tradition Continues.

Paulin died at one of his daughter's homes in suburban Marrero, Louisiana in Jefferson Parish.

Personal life 
Paulin was Catholic.

References

 
 

1907 births
2007 deaths
American centenarians
American jazz bandleaders
American jazz trumpeters
American male trumpeters
Jazz musicians from New Orleans
20th-century American musicians
20th-century trumpeters
People from St. John the Baptist Parish, Louisiana
20th-century American male musicians
American male jazz musicians
African-American Catholics
Men centenarians
20th-century African-American musicians